João Fernando Gomes Valério (born 31 July 2002) is a Brazilian singer and songwriter who came to national prominence with his debut album Eu tenho a senha. One song from the album, "Meu Pedaço de Pecado", was the most played song among Brazil's Spotify users as of 1 July 2021, and also appeared in Spotify's Top 50 Global chart the same month.

Biography 
Gomes was born in Serrita, Pernambuco, the son of a barber and a farmer. At a young age, he moved to Petrolina with his family, where he sang in the church choir from the age of seven. In 2019, while studying animal agriculture at the Federal Institute of Pernambuco, he began to record videos and publish them online, garnering some popularity. His debut album, Eu tenho a senha, was released in June 2021 and reached #40 on the Billboard Global 200. The following month, the first track from the album, "Meu Pedaço de Pecado", reached the top position on Spotify's "50 most played in Brazil" playlist, and also appeared in the platform's Top 50 Global playlist. At the 2021 Multishow Awards, Gomes was nominated for the New Artist award, while "Meu Pedaço de Pecado" was nominated for the Hit of the Year award.

Gomes sings in the forró genre, drawing inspiration from Serrita's cowboy culture. He cites Belchior and Cartola as his influences.

References 

2002 births
Living people
21st-century Brazilian male singers
21st-century Brazilian singers
People from Petrolina